Club de Futbol Lloret is a Spanish football team based in Lloret de Mar, in the autonomous community of Catalonia. Founded in 1921, it plays in Primera Catalana – Group 1, holding home games at Camp de Futbol Municipal, with a capacity of 400 people.

Season to season

14 seasons in Tercera División

References

External links
 
CF Lloret at Soccerway

Football clubs in Catalonia
Association football clubs established in 1921
1921 establishments in Spain